Serena and Venus Williams defeated Květa Peschke and Katarina Srebotnik in the final, 6–2, 6–3 to win the women's doubles tennis title at the 2010 French Open. It was their second French Open doubles title together and twelfth major title together overall. With the win, they became the sixth and seventh women to complete a non-calendar-year Grand Slam in doubles. Additionally, the Williams sisters jointly gained the world No. 1 doubles ranking for the first time, becoming the first sisters to be co-ranked world No. 1 in doubles. They also completed their second career Golden Slam in women's doubles.

Anabel Medina Garrigues and Virginia Ruano Pascual were the defending champions, but chose not to compete together. Ruano Pascual partnered with Meghann Shaughnessy, but lost in the first round to Cara Black and Elena Vesnina. Medina Garrigues partnered with Liezel Huber, but lost in the semifinals to the Williams sisters.

Seeds

Draw

Finals

Top half

Section 1

Section 2

Bottom half

Section 3

Section 4

References
Main draw
2010 French Open – Women's draws and results at the International Tennis Federation

Women's Doubles
French Open by year – Women's doubles
2010 in women's tennis
2010 in French women's sport